Chin United Football Club is a Burmese football club, based at Chin State, Myanmar. The club is one of the two teams representing Chin State along with GFA FC.

Sponsorship

Club

Coaching staff
{|class="wikitable"
|-
!Position
!Staff
|-
|Manager|| U Myint Swe
|-
|rowspan="1"|Assistant Manager|| U Yarza Win Thein
|-
|Goalkeeper Coach||
|-
|Fitness Coach||
|-

Other information

|-

2017 squad

References

External links
official website
Myanmar Football Federation

Myanmar National League